Hmawngbuchhuah is a village in Lawngtlai Block in Lawngtlai district in the state of Mizoram, India.

Location
147 km from State capital Aizawl. It lies on the border between Myanmar and India. It is on the east bank of Sekulh Lui River which makes the border. It is 10 km from the border town of Zochachhuah.

Demographics 

As of the 2011 Census of India, the population in Hmawngbuchhuah village is 389, with 97 Households. There are 190 males (49%) and 199 females (51%), with 3% Scheduled Tribe and no Scheduled Cast.

Connectivity 
It is located 4 km towards South from District headquarters Lawngtlai. It is located on the India-Myanmar border where National Highway 502 (India), Kaladan Multi-Modal Transit Transport Project, enters Myanmar.

100 km route from Indo-Myanmar border at Zorinpui to Aizawl is upgraded to two-lane in  both directions (total 4 lanes). From Aizawl it connect to Aizawl-Saiha National Highway at Lawngtlai in Mizoram in India by road on National Highway 54 (India) (NH-54), which then continues further to Dabaka in Assam via 850 km long NH-54 which in turn is part of the larger East-West Corridor connecting North East India with the rest of India. Almost complete (June 2017). Tender has been awarded, upgrade to this national highway is under-construction and to be Completed by 2019.

Survey for the Rail line from Sairang to Hmawngbuchhuah on border near Zorinpui was completed in August 2017 and it will be constructed in future phase.

Economy
The mainstay of economy is agriculture and it is a border town with integrated check post being built which will be operational by April 2019.

See also 
 Sittwe Port
 Zochachhuah

References

External links 
 Railway survey in Hmawngbuchhuah
 Kaladan Multi-Modal Transit Transport Project

Cities and towns in Lawngtlai district